Michel Foret (born 19 April 1948) is a Belgian politician and lawyer.  A member of the Reformist Movement, he is the current governor of Liège Province since 11 February 2004.

References

1948 births
Living people
Governors of Liège Province
Walloon movement activists
Walloon people
21st-century Belgian politicians